London River Services Limited is a division of Transport for London (TfL), which manages passenger transport—leisure-oriented tourist services and commuter services—on the River Thames in London. It does not own or operate any boats itself, except those of the Woolwich Ferry, but licenses the services of operators.

River service had been a common means of transport in London for centuries, but died off in the early 1900s, as transportation was enhanced (and river traffic somewhat blocked) with a proliferation of bridges and tunnels. With these numerous north–south crossings of the Thames, which is generally no more than 300m wide as it runs through central London, the revival of river boat services in London therefore mostly travel east or west along the Thames rather than across it; the only major cross-river ferry services are to be found further downstream where the river is wider, and there are far fewer bridge/tunnel crossings.

The decision to revive London's river service network moved forward in 1997 with the launch of "Thames", a £21-million project (£ million today) to regenerate the River Thames and create new passenger transport services on the Thames. While the service is not as extensive as those of Hong Kong or Sydney, it has been growing: in 2007, more than 700,000 commuters travelled by river on Thames Clippers services, one of the operators on the system; in 2013 the Thames Clippers service had grown to 3.3 million, as it had become more integrated into the tube and bus ticketing network; in 2014 their figure was 3.8 million; in 2015 it was forecasted that their ridership would increase to 4.3 million by 2016, supported by the addition of new Clipper boats. By 2018, there were 21 different operators carrying daily commuter, leisure, charter, or sightseeing passengers to various combinations of the 33 piers on the system.

History

Before the construction of London's bridges and the Underground, the River Thames had served as a major thoroughfare for centuries. Attempts to regulate the transport of passengers and goods began in 1197, when King Richard I sold the Crown's rights over the Thames to the City of London Corporation, which then attempted to license boats on the river. In 1510 Henry VIII granted a licence to watermen that gave exclusive rights to carry passengers on the river, and in 1555 an Act of Parliament set up the Company of Watermen and Lightermen to control traffic on the Thames.

For centuries the only bridge across the Thames was London Bridge. Crossing the river by wherry (small wooden rowing boat) was a common mode of transport.

19th century

Passenger steamboats were introduced in 1815 and the use of the river as a means of public transport increased greatly. River services ran from Gravesend, Margate and Ramsgate via Greenwich and Woolwich into central London. By the mid-1850s about 15,000 people per day travelled to work on steamboat services – twice the number of passengers on the newly emerging railways. With increased congestion on the river, collisions and other accidents became correspondingly more frequent, most notably with the Princess Alice disaster at Woolwich in 1878.

While the introduction of large steamboats and bridge construction had taken business from the Thames watermen, the growth of the railways took passengers away from the steamboat services and the use of the river for public transport began a steady decline. River service companies struggled financially, and in 1876 the five main boat companies merged to form the London Steamboat Company. The company ran a half-hourly service from Chelsea to Greenwich for eight years until it went bankrupt in 1884. Nevertheless, river services continued under different management into the next century. Many of the Thames paddle steamers around this time were built by the Thames Ironworks at Bow Creek.

20th century

In 1905 the London County Council (LCC) launched its own public river transport service to complement its new tram network, acquiring piers and investing in a large fleet of 30 paddle-steamers. Frequent services operated from Hammersmith to Greenwich. The LCC river service was not a success; in the first year it ran up debts of £30,000. It was shut down in 1907 after only two years' service.

Numerous proposals for "river bus" services were considered throughout the 20th century, although the few that were realised were cancelled after a short time in service. During World War II, from 13 September 1940 to 2 November 1940, a temporary wartime river bus service was introduced, running every 20 minutes, between Westminster and Woolwich using converted pleasure cruisers provided by the Port of London Authority to replace train, tram and trolleybus services which were disrupted by the bombing of the Blitz. London Transport bus inspectors and conductors issued and checked the tickets on board the boats.

With the move of the Port of London downstream in the 1960s, regular river transport was limited to a few sightseeing boats.

Revival of passenger services
In 1997 Secretary of State for Transport John Prescott launched Thames 2000, a £21-million project to regenerate the River Thames in time for the Millennium Celebrations and boost new passenger transport services on the Thames. The centrepiece of these celebrations was to be the Millennium Dome, but there was also a plan to provide a longer-term legacy of public transport boat services and piers on the river.

The Cross-River Partnership, a consortium of local authorities, private sector organisations and voluntary bodies, recommended the creation of a public body to co-ordinate and promote river services. This agency, provisionally titled the Thames Piers Agency, would integrate boat services into other modes of public transport, take control of Thames piers from the Port of London Authority, and commission the construction of new piers.

The result was the formation in 1999 of London River Services (LRS), a wholly owned subsidiary of Transport for London.

Mayor Ken Livingstone's Transport Strategy for London 2005 stated that: "The safe use of the Thames for passenger and freight services should be developed. Passenger services will be encouraged, particularly services that relate to its cultural and architectural excellence and tourism. Use of London's other navigable waterways for freight, consistent with their roles for leisure use and as ecosystems, will be encouraged."

21st century

Today, LRS is responsible for integrating river transport with the rest of the public transport network, such as the Tube and buses. It promotes boat services under the London River Services brand, issuing timetables and river maps.

LRS is also responsible for directly managing eight piers on the river, and invested in LRS-branded signage and passenger information.

LRS supports the Thames Clipper commuter service financially and increased the peak service frequency to a boat every 15 minutes. In April 2009 the signing of a "River Concordat" by London's pier owners, boat operators, borough councils and Transport for London was announced, committing the various parties to improving ticketing, piers and passenger information, and to closer integration into the transport network.

London River Services is not responsible for maintaining the river itself; the Port of London Authority takes care of river traffic control, security, navigational safety (including buoys, beacons, bridge lights and channel surveys), and the RNLI operates Thames lifeboat services.

Branding
The public presentation of London River Services is visually associated with existing TfL design standards, using identical graphic design elements to those used on London Underground publicity, signage and other elements, drawing on the design heritage of Frank Pick.

The London River Services brand is a sub-brand of TfL which uses the familiar Tube roundel, originally devised for London Underground and now established as the corporate branding for all TfL services. The River Services roundel is a dark blue (Pantone 072) bar on pale blue (Pantone 299) circle.

The corporate signage, stationery and literature of TfL services, including LRS, use the New Johnston typeface.

LRS publishes diagrammatic river maps in the style of Harry Beck's iconic Tube map. Tube maps published by TfL since 2000 denote river interchange stations with a boat symbol.

Services
The service patterns advertised by TfL can vary according to season. They are divided into three main types:

River Bus commuter services

Numbered River Bus services (abbreviated to RB) run to a timetable through the day with more frequent services during peak rush hour times. Most services run seven days a week, although some do not operate at weekends. Many operators offer discounted fares to Travelcard holders.  The main lines of operation are:

The catamaran-hulled vessels have on-board coffee bars, airline-style seating, are wheelchair-accessible and have bicycle racks.

Ferry services

In central London, the River Thames is narrow enough to allow it to be crossed by many bridges; further downstream however, the river widens and there are fewer bridge crossings. Two ferry services are still in operation:

Two other ferry services operate upstream in west London: Hammerton's Ferry and the Hampton Ferry. These services are independent of London River Services as they do not serve LRS-managed piers.

Leisure services

Leisure boats are aimed mainly at the tourist market; as they do not usually provide rush hour services, they are not normally suitable for commuting. Some boat companies run regular scheduled services, others may run twice daily, only on certain days of the week, or only during certain months of the year. Boats may also be chartered for private hire. Destinations are often tourist attractions such as the Tate Galleries or Hampton Court Palace.
 Bankside – Waterloo – Millbank (Tate to Tate)
 Festival Pier – High Speed RIB Tours (Operated By Rib Tours London)
 London Eye River Cruise
 Multilingual Circular Cruise
 Greenwich Pier Sunday Evening Thames Sightseeing Cruise (Campion Launches)
 MV Balmoral and Paddle Steamer Waverley Cruises from Tower Pier
 Richmond – Kingston – Hampton Court
 Tilbury/Gravesend – Greenwich
 Westminster – Kew – Richmond – Hampton Court
 Westminster – St Katharine's Hop-on, Hop-off circular service
 Westminster – Waterloo – Tower – Greenwich
 Westminster Pier – High Speed RIB Tours (Operated By Thames Jet)
 Westminster Pier – Tower Bridge Quay – Greenwich Pier – Thames Flood Barrier (Barrier Gardens Pier) (Operated by Thames River Services)

Operators
Scheduled tourist and commuter services on the river are operated by a number of private companies, including:

Charter services, usually catering for large parties, are also available from these and other operators.

Piers

London River Services lists 24 piers on the River Thames in its publications, of which 8 are managed directly by LRS.

Millennium Piers

In 2000, five new piers were opened with funding from the Millennium Commission under its Thames 2000 project, with a grant of £7,177,000:
 Tower Millennium Pier
 Blackfriars Millennium Pier
 London Eye Pier
 Westminster Millennium Pier
 Millbank Millennium Pier

The new piers were provided to improve previously neglected travel connections on the Thames and promote the river as an alternative means of public transport.

List of piers
Scheduled tourist and commuter services use the following piers, although no single service serves all the piers listed. The piers are listed in order going downstream:

Fares and ticketing

Unlike the underground and bus networks, boat operators have their own separate ticketing arrangements and charge separate fares which are generally higher than corresponding journeys by tube or bus. The only exception is the Woolwich Ferry, which is free of charge.

Oyster card is valid on most Thames Clipper services for single fares, offering a ten percent discount. Most boat operators offer discounts to Travelcard holders, as well as to Freedom Pass holders and students.

Ticket sales at piers are managed independently by the operators, and tickets are sold at separate kiosks with no facility for cross-ticketing. Many piers have a line of several sales desks, each owned by a different boat firm. Single tickets can often be bought on board the boat, but this is down to individual operator arrangements.

Some operators offer their own season tickets and carnets of single tickets. Thames Clipper, for example, offer a one-day Roamer ticket which allows multiple journeys within off-peak hours.

See also

Crossrail
Cycling in London
Docklands Light Railway
East London Transit
London Overground
Tramlink
Transport on the Regent's Canal

References

External links

 London River Services Website
 Map of River Services
 Collection of Google Earth locations of London River Services Piers (Requires Google Earth) from the Google Earth Community forum.
 Summary of Thames steamer services – historical information on former steamboat companies of London (Tramscape)

 
Ferry companies of England
River Services
Transport organisations based in London
Water transport in London